Ivory Hunters (also titled The Last Elephant) is a 1990 television film directed by Joseph Sargent and starring John Lithgow, Isabella Rossellini and James Earl Jones.

Cast
John Lithgow as Robert Carter
Isabella Rossellini as Maria DiConti
James Earl Jones as Inspector Nkuru
Tony Todd as Jomo
Olek Krupa
Oliver Litondo as Kenneth
Sidede Onyulo as Sirwa

References

External links
 
 

1990 films
Films directed by Joseph Sargent
Films scored by Charles Bernstein
1990 television films
TNT Network original films
1990s English-language films